The College of Arts, Humanities and Social Sciences at the University of Maryland, Baltimore County (CAHSS) has 22 departments, and offers 30 Bachelor's, 16 Master's, and 6 Ph.D. programs. The college also includes several scholarship programs; the Linehan Artist Scholars Program, the Humanities Scholars Program, and the Sondheim Public Affairs Scholars Program. The college oversees several centers; the Dresher Center for Humanities, the Imaging Research Center, and the Maryland Institute for Policy Analysis and Research.

In July 2013, Scott E. Casper became dean the College of Arts, Humanities and Social Sciences. Casper was the interim dean of the College of Liberal Arts at the University of Nevada, Reno. Casper area of speciality is history.

Research and awards

Faculty members of CAHSS have won fellowships, awards and research grants from such organizations as the National Endowment for the Humanities, the National Endowment for the Arts, the National Institutes of Health, the National Science Foundation, and the Guggenheim Foundation and the Fulbright Program. Some recent examples include a $1.4 million grant from NIH to the Center for Aging Studies for diabetes research, and a $1.8 million grant from the National Science Foundation for the university's geography and environmental science faculty to develop an online infrastructure for scientists who study land change.

The National Endowment for the Humanities has supported “For All the World to See: Visual Culture and the Struggle for Civil Rights,” a signature exhibit of the Center for Art, Design and Visual Culture. The full exhibit was featured at the Smithsonian Institution and four other museums, and a version of it is traveling to dozens of locations across the country as part of NEH on the Road.

Departments & Programs 

 Africana Studies 
 American Studies 
 Ancient Studies
 Asian Studies 
 Dance 
 Economics 
 Education 
 Emergency Health Services 
 English 
 Gender and Women's Studies 
 Geography and Environmental Systems
 Global Studies 
 History
 Judaic Studies  
 Language, Literacy and Culture 
 Media and Communication Studies  
 Modern Languages and Linguistics 
 Music 
 Philosophy 
 Political Science 
 Psychology 
 Public Policy 
 Sociology, Anthropology, and Public Health
 Public Policy 
 Theatre 
 Visual Arts

References

External links

College of Arts, Humanities and Social Sciences Departmental Directory

College of Arts, Humanities and Social Sciences
Liberal arts colleges at universities in the United States
Arts, Humanities and Social Sciences
Educational institutions established in 1966